Herman Krier is an American engineer currently Emeritus Professor at University of Illinois at Urbana–Champaign and formerly the Richard W. Kritzer Distinguished Professor from 1998 to 2008.

References

Year of birth missing (living people)
Living people
University of Illinois Urbana-Champaign faculty
21st-century American engineers
Princeton University alumni
University of Pittsburgh alumni